, known professionally as Taka, is a Japanese singer and musician who is the lead vocalist of the Japanese rock band One Ok Rock. Moriuchi is the band's main lyricist and composer. In 2017, Kerrang! magazine placed him at number 27 on their list of the "50 Greatest Rockstars in the World". He was also listed by Rock Sound magazine as one of "50 Most Influential Figures in Rock".

Prior to One Ok Rock, he was in the boyband News throughout 2003 until he left the group and the agency. He performs in English and Japanese.

Personal life
Taka was born on April 17, 1988, the eldest son of famous Japanese singers Masako Mori and Shinichi Mori. He has two younger brothers named Tomohiro Moriuchi who works on TV Tokyo, and Hiroki Moriuchi who is the lead singer of the band My First Story.

He attended Keio Elementary School and graduated in March 2001, then continued his studies at Keio Middle School in April 2001. He joined soccer club in his first year of middle school. In April 2004, he attended Keio High School until his first year of high school (March 2005). He then dropped out to pursue his musical career. After dropping out of high school, after a fight with his parents he left home and lived with his grandmother. During this time, he took up a part-time job at a restaurant in Aoyama to prepare himself for living alone. In April 2005, his parents divorced.

In 2005, he changed his last name from Moriuchi (森内) to Morita (森田) due to the divorce of his parents. However, in the June 2012 issue of the magazine, Rockin'On Japan, he stated in an interview that his real name is Takahiro Moriuchi. 
In 2013, he is shown again in a photo using his last name, Moriuchi, where all One Ok Rock band members held a written sign of their real names. The photo was taken by photographer, Rui Hashimoto.

Taka wrote the song "Nobody's Home" on fourth album Niche Syndrome, tells about his apology and gratitude straightforwardly for his parents. The song was performed at several concerts, including at the Nippon Budokan in 2010 where his parents attended the concert.

Career

2001–2004: Career beginnings and other musical pursuits
Taka signed with Johnny's Entertainment in August 2001 at age 13. He joined as a trainee in the group called Johnny's Junior and made some singing appearances on Japanese music shows during this period. In September 2003, two years after joining the agency, Taka was one of the Johnny's Juniors chosen to be part of the idol group News. However, his activities were suspended when he left the agency and the group in December of the same year.

He was briefly in a cover band called Chivalry of Music in 2004, consisted of a keyboardist, a guitarist, and him on vocals.

2005–present: One Ok Rock

Taka was invited by guitarist Toru Yamashita to join One Ok Rock in 2005. The band released their first independent CD in 2006 and were signed by Amuse, Inc., whom they made their major debut with. 
The band did moderately well with music sales until they hit with major success in August 2012 upon the release of "The Beginning", which was the theme song for the live action movie adaption of the manga and anime, Rurouni Kenshin. The band's concerts have been sold out many times with high attendance and constantly adding new tour dates in Japan. ONE OK ROCK has also held concert tours overseas in Asia, U.S., Europe and South America.

In March 2013, Simple Plan announced a new version of their song "Summer Paradise" with Moriuchi for a Japanese-only release  They later performed together at the music festival, Punkspring 2013 in Tokyo, Japan.

In November 2013, Taka helped Pay Money to My Pain to sing and write one of their songs on their tribute album Gene after their vocalist, K (Kei Goto), died due to heart failure.

In summer 2014, One Ok Rock's newest songs, "Mighty Long Fall" and "Heartache" were featured as theme songs for the live action movie sequels, Rurouni Kenshin: Kyoto Inferno and Rurouni Kenshin: The Legend Ends, respectively.

In February 2015, Moriuchi was featured as a guest vocalist on the track "Dreaming Alone" by Against the Current.

As of July 2015, One Ok Rock is signed with the U.S. label, Warner Bros. Records and released an English version of their album, 35xxxv in February 2015.

On September 11, 2016, One Ok Rock signed with Fueled by Ramen. Their eighth album, Ambitions, was released on January 11, 2017, for the Japanese version album under the Japanese label A-Sketch and on January 13, 2017, for the English version album under the American label Fueled by Ramen.

In July 2017, Moriuchi was featured on the track "Don't Let Me Go" from Goldfinger's album The Knife as a guest vocalist. On 27 October 2017, he appeared at Linkin Park and Friends – Celebrate Life in Honor of Chester Bennington, performing "Somewhere I Belong" with the remaining members of Linkin Park. On May 12, 2018, he guested on Linkin Park co-vocalist Mike Shinoda's show at Identity Festival in Los Angeles, performing "Waiting for the End / Where'd You Go" mash-up.

On September 14, 2020, Journey frontman Arnel Pineda collaborated with him covering the 1981 Journey classic ballad "Open Arms". The cover was recorded separately in isolation, and uploaded on Pineda's YouTube channel.

Artistry

Influences
His greatest influences are Linkin Park, Good Charlotte, The Used, Red Hot Chili Peppers, Thirty Seconds to Mars, hide, Maroon 5, Adele, Rize, Issues, Sum 41, Green Day and Simple Plan. His favorite artists are X Japan, Bring Me the Horizon, Radwimps, Michael Jackson, Vanessa Carlton, Attack Attack!, Asking Alexandria, Destrage, Coldplay, Nickelback and Avril Lavigne. He has also cited Chester Bennington from Linkin Park and Kellin Quinn from Sleeping With Sirens as his inspirations to switch from pop music to rock music.

Discography

Collaborations

Songs written by Takahiro Moriuchi

Appearances on music videos

References

External links

  
 Official Taka Instagram
 An Interview with Taka from ONE OK ROCK at jame-world

1988 births
Japanese male rock singers
Japanese songwriters
Living people
One Ok Rock members
News (band) members
Singers from Tokyo
A-Sketch artists
English-language singers from Japan
21st-century Japanese singers
21st-century Japanese male singers
Alternative rock singers